Kitty Tsui (born 1952) is a Cantonese-American author, poet, actor, and bodybuilder. She was the first known Cantonese-American lesbian to publish a book (Words of a Woman who Breathes Fire, published in 1983).

Personal life 
Tsui was born in Hong Kong and lived there with her grandmother, Chinese actress Kwan Ying Lin, until she was five. She then lived with her parents in Liverpool, England until they immigrated to San Francisco in 1968. She attended Lowell High School. Tsui graduated from San Francisco State University in 1975 with a Bachelor's degree in English language and literature.

Tsui came out as lesbian in 1973, at age 21, and was rejected by most of her family and friends. After the death of a friend in 1986, Tsui began bodybuilding. She says bodybuilding has allowed her to love herself and challenge male standards of beauty.

Career

Writing 
She is the author of Words of a Woman who Breathes Fire (the first known book by a Chinese American lesbian, published in 1983), Breathless (a short story collection of erotica involving BDSM which won the Firecracker Alternative Book Award, published in 1996), and Sparks Fly (a novel written from the perspective of a gay leatherman in San Francisco, published in 1997). She has also been published in over ninety anthologies and journals.

She came out as a leather woman in 1988. She wrote the first leather column in the Midwest (it was called ”Leathertalk: Top to Bottom”, and published in Chicago Nightlines), gave workshops and presentations about leather, and judged leather competitions including but not limited to International Ms. Leather. She wrote the piece “Sex does not equal death” for the 1996 anthology The second coming: a leatherdyke reader, edited by Patrick Califia and Robin Sweeney.

Acting 
Tsui has acted in stage productions with the Asian American Theater Company and Lilith Women's Theater, and has been featured in five films including Nice Chinese Girls Don't: Kitty Tsui, Framing Lesbian Fashion, and Women of Gold. Tsui was a founding member of Unbound Feet, the first Asian American women's performance group, and a member of Unbound Feet Three.

Bodybuilding 
In 1986, Tsui won the bronze medal at Gay Games II, and a gold medal at Gay Games III Vancouver Gay Games in women's physique and bodybuilding. She has competed in a variety of bodybuilding championships and competitions.

Awards and Activism 
She is widely recognized as a leader in the Asian Pacific Islander queer movement in San Francisco. In 2016, she was given the Asian Pacific Islander Queer Women and Transgender Community’s Phoenix Award for her contributions to the San Francisco leather community and her work as an author, activist, and founding member of Unbound Feet. In 2018, she was inducted into her alma mater, San Francisco State University's Alumni Hall of Fame. In 2019 she was commissioned to create a poem/video for a digital exhibit at the Smithsonian Asian Pacific American Center titled, "A Day in the Life of Queer Asian Pacific America." She was one of twelve queer poets from the United States selected for this honor. Lambda Literary listed Tsui as one of the 50 most influential lesbian and gay writers in the United States.

References 

1952 births
American bodybuilders
American erotica writers
American people of Chinese descent
American women poets
BDSM writers
Leather subculture
American LGBT people of Asian descent
Living people
21st-century American women